Tzachi Halevy (or Tsahi HaLevi, ; born March 12, 1975) is an Israeli film and television actor and a singer.

Early and personal life
Tzachi Halevy was born in Petah Tikva, Israel, to a Sephardic Jewish family. His father was an 8th generation Sabra, whereas his mother is of Moroccan-Jewish origin. As a child he lived in many countries due to his father's work in the Israeli Prime Minister's Office.

Halevy has resided in Tel Aviv since the late 1990s. He is divorced from the Israeli dancer Una Holbrook, with whom he has a son. He married Arab-Israeli news anchor Lucy Aharish, in a private ceremony on October 10, 2018, after four years of a relationship that was kept secret until then for fear of harassment. Their marriage was criticized by many for his "non-Jewish Intermarriage", but others congratulated them. Aharish gave birth to their son in March 2021.

Music and acting career

Music
Halevy has been a member of the Mayumana troupe that combines dance, song, and percussion since 1999.

Halevy's breakthrough came in 2012, when he took part in the first season of the reality show The Voice Israel under mentor Shlomi Shabat. He reached the final but did not win. After appearing on The Voice, he began working on his first album "Kivvunim" ("Directions"), which was released in 2012. In 2014, he collaborated with Idan Raichel and wrote the French song "Petit Roi". In 2015, he released the single "Tamali Ma'aek" (تملي معاك), a cover of an Arabic song he performed during the shooting of Fauda.

In December 2020, Tzachi Halevy won the first season of the Israeli production of The Masked Singer as The Rooster. Among his fellow contestants was his wife Lucy, who performed as The Stork.

Acting
In 2012 he began his acting career, appearing on plays at Habima Theatre and Haifa Theater.

In 2013, Halevy starred in the drama film Bethlehem, Ophir Award winner for best picture. He portrayed 'Razi', a Shin Bet agent, and won an Ophir Award for Best Supporting Actor for his performance.

In 2014, he portrayed 'Shlomi Daddon' on the Hot 3 television series Metim LeRega alongside Agam Rudberg, Ofer Shechter, and Yuval Segal. That year, he also appeared on Betulot as 'Haim Toledano', and worked alongside Sasson Gabai and Maggie Azarzar.

In February 2015, the political-thriller television series Fauda first aired on 'yes'.  In it Halevy portrays 'Naor', a member of a Mista'arvim unit. He later appeared in the 2015 drama film The Kind Words as 'Ricky.'

In 2016, he played a small role on Channel 10's drama television series Hostages.  In 2017, he appeared on the second season of the television action series Mossad 101 as 'Liron Harriri', the head of a crime family, and on HOT's Full Moon as 'Baruch'.

In 2018, Halevy appeared as Ephraim in Mary Magdalene, written by Helen Edmundson and directed by Garth Davis.

Filmography
Films
 Bethlehem (2013)
 The Kind Words (2015)
 Damascus Cover (2017)
 Mary Magdalene (2018)
 The Angel (2018)
 All in (2019
 Forgiveness (Mechila) (2019)
 Mossad (2019)
 Laila in Haifa (2020)

Television
 Metim LeRega (2014)
 Betulot (2014)
 Fauda (2015)
 Mossad 101 (2017)
 Full Moon (2017)
 The Grave (2019)

References

External links

 Profile on 'edb.co.il' 
 Yoav Birenberg, "It is never too late", ynet, 15 February 2017 

1975 births
Living people
Israeli Sephardi Jews
Israeli male film actors
Israeli male television actors
20th-century Israeli male actors
21st-century Israeli male actors
People from Petah Tikva
Israeli people of Moroccan-Jewish descent
Israeli Mizrahi Jews
Masked Singer winners